The 1996 United States Senate election in Arkansas was held on November 5, 1996. Incumbent Democratic U.S. Senator David Pryor decided to retire. Republican Tim Hutchinson won the open seat, becoming the first Republican to win a U.S. Senate seat in Arkansas since Reconstruction. As of 2022, this is the last time Republicans flipped a Senate seat in a presidential year despite losing the state in the presidential election.

Democratic Primary

Candidates 
 Winston Bryant, Arkansas Attorney General
 Lu Hardin, State Senator
 Bill Bristow, attorney 
 Sandy McMath, attorney and son of former Governor Sidney Sanders McMath
 Kevin Smith, State Senator

Withdrew
 Jay Bradford, State Senator from Pine Bluff, Senator Majority Whip, and Democratic nominee for U.S. Representative in 1994 (endorsed Bryant)
 Pat Hays, mayor of North Little Rock (endorsed Bryant)

Declined
 Mike Beebe, then a State Senator in the Arkansas General Assembly and a future Governor explored a bid but didn't announce.
 Mack McLarty, 17th White House Chief of Staff (endorsed McMath)
 Lamar Pettus, Associate Justice of the Supreme Court of Arkansas (ran for Chief Justice of the Arkansas Supreme Court)

Arkansas Attorney General Winston Bryant and Arkansas State Senator Lu Hardin finished in the top two in the primary, and Bryant narrowly defeated Hardin in the runoff.

Results (Primary)

Runoff

Republican primary

Candidates 
 Mike Huckabee, Lieutenant Governor of Arkansas

Results
Huckabee was unopposed for the nomination.

Huckabee withdrawal
Although Huckabee won the Senate nomination unopposed in the May primary, he abandoned his Senate bid when Governor Jim Guy Tucker resigned from office and he became Governor of Arkansas.

Replacement selection
Following Huckabee's withdrawal, several candidates announced their interest in running:

 John E. Brown, State Senator from Siloam Springs
 Jay Dickey, U.S. Representative from Pine Bluff
 Tim Hutchinson, U.S. Representative from Fort Smith
 Julia Hughes Jones, former Arkansas State Auditor (1980—1994)

The main candidates were Dickey and Hutchinson, but in light of a potential impasse, some compromise candidates were floated:

 Ed Bethune, former U.S. Representative from Searcy and nominee for Senate in 1984
 Steve Luelf, former State Senator and candidate for Governor in 1994
 Sheffield Nelson, Chair of the Arkansas Republican Party and gubernatorial nominee in 1990 and 1994
 Tommy F. Robinson, former U.S. Representative and candidate for Governor in 1990
 Frank D. White, former Governor of Arkansas (1980–1982)

On June 11th, White, Nelson, and Bethune all endorsed Hutchinson. Shortly thereafter, Jones and Dickey withdrew and endorsed Hutchinson. Brown also withdrew his candidacy to seek Hutchinson's open House seat, which he lost to Hutchinson's older brother Asa Hutchinson in a special convention. Hutchinson was ratified as the nominee by the Arkansas Republican State Committee.

Results

Hutchinson won election to the U.S. Senate, receiving just over 5% more of the vote than his opponent Bryant. This was despite incumbent U.S. President Bill Clinton being re-elected by a 17-point margin in his home state of Arkansas, though the state had begun to trend more Republican at the time.

See also 
 1996 United States Senate elections

References 

Arkansas
1996
1996 Arkansas elections